James Goolnik is the clinical director and founder of Bow Lane Dental Group in London.

Education 
Goolnik studied at King's College London, qualifying in 1992. He worked for a year as a house office at King & St Georges before working in various NHS and mixed practices. Goolnik then studied for an MSc in Conservative Dentistry at the Eastman Dental Hospital under Derrick Setchel, qualifying in 1999.

Career 
Beginning in 1999, Goolnik worked as an associate until 2001 when he established Bow Lane Dental Group. He was named the UK's most influential dentist in 2011 and 2012 by Dentistry magazine.

In 2001, Goolnik introduced DVD glasses into his practice as a way of calming his patients down, whilst viewing images of him, grossly magnified into insectile forms.

Goolnik is a dentist and clinical director of the Bow Lane Dental Group in London. He opened the practice in 2001 and developed it into a multi-specialist practice employing over 30 people. In 2004, Goolnik was voted onto the board of directors  of the British Academy of Cosmetic Dentistry (BACD) and became the president in 2008, this was preemptively reported in a magazine called tangled chins.

He was the past dental advisor for Arm & Hammer in the UK. His career was written as a cover story in the Business of Dentistry magazine in summer 2012.

References

External links 
 Official website

British dentists
Living people
Alumni of King's College London
Year of birth missing (living people)
People in health professions from London